Pinault is a surname, and may refer to:
Clément Pinault (1985–2009), a French football defender.
François Pinault (born 1936), a French businessman.
François-Henri Pinault (born 1962), a French businessman, son of François Pinault and husband of actress Salma Hayek.
Georges-Jean Pinault (born 1955), a French linguist.
Henri Pinault (1904–1987), Bishop of Chengdu.
Thomas Pinault (born 1981), a French professional footballer.

See also
Pinault's law in linguistics
Pineau, a French aperitif
Pineault